Eorhinophrynus is an extinct genus of prehistoric frog from Wyoming.

See also
 List of prehistoric amphibians

References

Paleogene amphibians
Rhinophrynidae
Prehistoric amphibian genera
Fossil taxa described in 1959